Lumír Mistr (born 12 January 1969) is a retired Czech football midfielder.

References

1969 births
Living people
Czech footballers
Czechoslovakia international footballers
AC Sparta Prague players
1. FK Příbram players
Aris Thessaloniki F.C. players
Association football midfielders
Belgian Pro League players
Czech First League players
Czech expatriate footballers
Expatriate footballers in Greece
Czech expatriate sportspeople in Greece